Willie Alexander (born September 21, 1949) is a former professional American football player who played defensive back for the National Football League's Houston Oilers from 1971 to 1979. Before his professional career, Alexander played for Alcorn State University.

External links
NFL.com player page

1949 births
Living people
South Texas College of Law people
Alcorn State Braves football players
American football cornerbacks
Players of American football from Montgomery, Alabama
Houston Oilers players